The Compliance Team Inc., is a US for-profit organization which runs the "Exemplary Provider" accreditation programs, a US-based alternative to the Joint Commission. It was set up in 1994 and is based in Philadelphia, Pennsylvania.

In 2006, The Compliance Team was formally granted national deeming authority by the Centers for Medicare and Medicaid Services as an accrediting body for all type of durable medical equipment (DME) including respiratory, mobility, woundcare, orthopedic, prosthetics, orthotics, diabetic, ostomy, and incontinence supplies. DME point of service providers include pharmacy, home care, podiatrists and orthopedic surgeons. 

The Compliance Team has accredited approximately 5,000 DMEPOS providers in the US and Puerto Rico. It has been reported that demand for participation in their Exemplary Provider Program has significantly increased since being awarded Medicare deeming status.

See also
Hospital accreditation 
International healthcare accreditation
List of healthcare accreditation organisations in the USA
Patient safety 
Patient safety organization

References

External links
 Official Web Page
 Statement of Sandra C. Canally with Compliance Team to the United States House Committee on Ways and Means
 Accreditation, by Global Media Marketing
 Liberator Medical Holdings, Inc.’s Subsidiary Liberator Medical Supply, Inc. Receives Certificate of Accreditation From the Compliance Team, Inc.

Healthcare accreditation organizations in the United States
Hospitals in the United States
Medicare and Medicaid (United States)